The IBM 6580 Displaywriter System is a 16-bit microcomputer that was marketed and sold by IBM's Office Products Division primarily as a word processor. Announced in June 1980 and effectively withdrawn from marketing in July 1986, the system was sold with a 5 MHz Intel 8086, 128K to 448K of RAM, a swivel-mounted monochrome CRT monitor, a detached keyboard, a detached 8" floppy disk drive enclosure with one or two drives, and a detached daisy wheel printer, or Selectric typewriter printer. The primary operating system for the Displaywriter is IBM's internally developed word processing software titled "Textpack", but UCSD p-System, CP/M-86 and MS-DOS were also offered by IBM, Digital Research and CompuSystems, respectively.

Software

Textpack 
The primary Displaywriter operating system, Textpack, is a word processing suite that was aimed at automating document creation and finalization. It was offered in six versions (1, E, 2, 3, 4, & 6) each sporting progressively more features. These features varied from basic text editing with the lowest Textpacks, E and 1, to being able to spell check, mail merge, automatically generate headers and footers, customize menu shortcuts, save and recall macros, process light arithmetic and simultaneously run additional IBM programs, such as a 3278 terminal session with Textpack 6. Textpacks 4 and 6 also offered the ability to combine all program disks into a single DS DD floppy, which could then also be used for document storage if space remained on the disk.   

Though technically capable of multi-tasking, Textpack is not a general purpose operating system. It bootstraps to a menu of text editing and pagination functions, with the option to also load one of several IBM supplemental programs, called "Feature Programs". These programs included: "Chartpack", a program to create business charts that could be inserted into typed documents; "Reportpack", a program to create and manage lists of data; "Language pack", to provide spell checking in 11 languages; "Extended Spelling Dictionary", which provided spell checking for United States legal terminology; "Electronic Document Distribution", to share Displaywriter documents with a S/370 mainframe; Bisynchronous and Asynchronous communications; 3277 terminal emulation; 3278 terminal emulation; IBM mag card conversion software; a "PC attach program", which allowed file sharing and fixed disk sharing with an IBM PC/jr/XT; and also several tailored templates for specialized data processing including "Administrative Support", "Educational Fund Raising", "Title Insurance", "Applicant Processing" and "Personnel Report".  

According to IBM, this tiered approach of incorporating multiple levels of operating systems and associated feature programs, was an attempt to make the Displaywriter more economical for smaller businesses, who could choose a cheaper software package and then upgrade as their needs required. The Textpack version could be increased without having to repurchase feature programs, and new feature programs could usually be integrated without having to increase the Textpack version. That said, revisions of feature programs are keyed to Textpack maintenance levels. For example, a revision of Textpack 4 from 1984 could not use a revision of a feature program from 1982, it would require a newer revision of that feature program from 1984. IBM used the six character disk labels of the program disks to determine whether one disk was compatible with another. If a disk label of a noncompatible program diskette is changed to a label associated with a compatible diskette, the Displaywriter will attempt to execute the disk as if it contained the correct software, but certain features will either not function properly, or Textpack will abend.

Diskettes used within Textpack are always formatted as either 284 kB capacity if the disk is 1D, or 985 kB capacity if the disk is 2D, regardless of a disk's actual advertized capacity. This is a software limitation of Textpack, and not a hardware limitation of the Displaywriter. Because there is no user accessible setting to designate disk sector size within Textpack, the operating system arbitrarily assumes that all 1D disks are rated as SS SD with 256B sectors and that all 2D disks are rated as DS DD with 256B sectors, which results in the aforementioned capacities. The format that Textpack diskettes utilized, though similar to the IBM 3740 Data Entry System, was uniquely proprietary and not interchangeable with any other IBM system, including the Displaywriter's predecessor, the Office System 6. Text created in Textpack is stored in a file structure unique to the Displaywriter and is encoded with 8-bit EBCDIC. The Displaywriter also supports ASCII, but 8-bit EBCDIC is used in this context in order to take advantage of the 256 characters available per EBCDIC font set, compared to the maximum of 128 characters available per ASCII font set. The Displaywriter uses two of these EBCDIC 256 character font sets, which are stored in ROM on the display adapter card in either two or four PROM chips depending on the card revision, in order to achieve a total of 512 possible available characters. When instructed, the Displaywriter draws from these font sets to generate a working character table in RAM for the operating system to use. Only 256 of the available 512 characters can be used concurrently by the user, but characters from either character set can be mixed and matched to total up to 256 and characters can be hot swapped to in software. Changing characters can be done in Textpack by using the "keyboard change" button on the keyboard. The ASCII code set is accessible within Textpack while using the Asynchronous or Bisynchronous communication features, where the Displaywriter converts the stored EBCDIC characters into ASCII before transmitting and after receiving text. Additionally, if the user wishes to type in ASCII directly during a communication session, they can change the keyboard to keyboard #103 which is the standard ASCII keyboard. While in ASCII mode the Displaywriter can generate all printable ASCII characters. ASCII control characters can be accessed at any time, even in EBCDIC mode, by depressing the control key (the blank key above  on the keyboard), and then pressing a corresponding key in the alphanumeric block. This is because they don't add to the 256 displayable character total.

UCSD p-System 
UCSD p-System was the official "data processing" operating system for the Displaywriter, offered by IBM through contract with Softech Microsystems. Announced in September 1982 and made available in December 1982, as part of the contract, p-System was extensively supported by Softech Microsystems, and had multiple feature upgrades offered from IBM as time went on. When purchasing UCSD p-System for Displaywriter, the purchaser could chose between p-System Runtime, or p-System "Development System", which was the same as Runtime, but was bundled with a BASIC compiler or an additional Fortran-77, 8086 Assembly code, or PASCAL compiler. IBM also sold a software upgrade that would provide p-System with the appropriate I/O calls for the RS232 port(s) on the Displaywriter's communications card, as well as a conversion utility, titled "B&H Exchange Utility", to convert UCSD format files to "B&H" format files, which is the file structure used on the System/23 Datamaster, System/36 and System/38. p-System did not pick up much steam on the Displaywriter, but was notably used by the USDA Rural Development as the operating system for the "Farmer Program Servicing Action System", which was a custom software suite written by the Rural Development agency. Additional programs offered by IBM for Displaywriter p-System included: "Financial Planning and Report Generating System", which was an advanced version of Reportpack that included financial modeling and easier report generation, "QUICKSTART Utility", which decreased load time of large programs, and "Money-Track" financial tracking by Pacific Data Systems.

CP/M-86 
Digital Research announced CP/M-86 v1.1 with BDOS 2.2 for the Displaywriter in November 1981, with orders starting to ship in Q1 1982. The release contains custom I/O calls and printer configuration menus for the Displaywriter's proprietary hardware. It is functionally equivalent to CP/M-86 for the IBM PC, but with the caveat that the limitations of the Displaywriter disk subsystem and graphics card prevent HDD support or raster/vector graphics support from being possible. That said, most CP/M-86 software is compatible. Due to the wide variety of hardware architectures that ran CP/M, most CP/M-86 software has a keyboard and CRT control code configuration menu, where the appropriate information can be entered for the Displaywriter. CP/M-86 was originally meant to be released under contract, similar to UCSD p-System, but this ultimately fell through, and the operating system was instead offered independently by Digital Research. Reflective of the failed agreement, the independent product revisions were classified as "Maintenance Levels" which is an IBM internal term denoting software revisions, and is not a term used in other Digital Research products. While the internal data stream of the Displaywriter is EBCDIC, the Displaywriter was already fully capable of translating the data stream into displayable ASCII outputs as part of the features of the Textpack software. This functionality was used to run CP/M-86 in ASCII mode. The prerelease version of CP/M-86 had a manually mapped keyboard, but the production release utilized the keyboard IDs produced by the Displaywriter keyboard controller and was capable of switching between keyboard layouts within the setup menu. CCP/M-86 with BDOS 3.1 for Displaywriter also began development in Q4 1981 but was never offered as an official product. Only a prerelease build is available today.

MS-DOS 
MS-DOS version 1.25 was offered independently by CompuSystems out of South Carolina. Due to the limitations of MS-DOS version 1.25 and the Displaywriter hardware, the scope of applications that can be run is limited. The release is otherwise similar to MS-DOS 1.25 OEMs done for other systems of the era. The "MS-DOS Loader" written by CompuSystems ignores the Displaywriter's ROM BAT results and does its own hardware assessment when loading the operating system. Limited printer support is included through  but DOS assumes that the printer is a tractor-fed 5218.

Hardware & ROS Embedded Programs 
The Displaywriter hardware, though in some ways comparable to the IBM 5150, did not use off the shelf components, an open architecture, or third party peripherals. The electronic components bear a physical resemblance to IBM's enterprise level hardware of the era, and in fact many components have been recycled from other systems, such as certain IBM-branded chips, the monitor (which is a recolored 3101 terminal CRT), or the disk drives.

Electronics Unit 
The physical layout of the system electronics unit, which is the box that the CRT mounts to, consists of a power supply on one half, and cards containing different functions slotted into a backplane with six slots, labeled A-F, that IBM referred to as the system distribution board, on the other half. The system distribution board is passive and has no logic or components of its own. Instead, each of the cards that are inserted utilize the distribution board as an extension of the system bus. The "system card", which is inserted into slot B of the distribution board, contains most of the functions that would be expected on a PC mainboard, including: clock, central processor, ROS ("Read Only Storage", aka ROM), keyboard adapter, interrupt controller and direct memory access controller. However, RAM is not part of the system card and is instead attached as a discrete card in slot E and in some cases also slot F. The disk controller is not located within the electronics unit at all and is instead located within the unit containing the floppy disk drives. Additionally, with some communications configurations, the communications adapter is also located inside the floppy drive unit. These two things necessitated the extension of the system bus outside of the electronics unit through a cable to the drive unit. There is a blue berg connector on the reverse side of the system card that facilitates this. Slot A on the distribution card will contain the communications card when it is not located in the disk unit. Slot C will contain a feature card and slot D always contains the display adapter card.           

The Displaywriter contained, at the time, extensive self test features that were stored in ROS (ROM) chips on the "system card".

While proprietary, the Displaywriter hardware was meant to be configurable to tailor suit the needs of the organization ordering the machine and offered multiple configuration options and additional feature cards. Feature cards included: a 3277 emulation card, a 3274/3276 attachment card, a printer sharing card, a single external EIA modem card, a dual external EIA modem card, a X.21 communications card, a local device communications card, an enhanced Chartpack display card and a memory expansion card. Additional configuration options included a 25- or (vertically-oriented) 66-line display, one or two disk drives, 1 sided or 2 sided disk drives, a beamspring (Type A) or Model F (Type B) keyboard, and RAM configurations between 128 and 448 KB.  

"A basic system — consisting of a display with a typewriter-like keyboard and a logic unit, a printer and a device to record and read diskettes capable of storing more than 100 pages of average text — cost  and leased for  a month." The basic word-processing software was Textpack E, with simple mail merge; Textpack 2 added support for double-sided disks, networking, spellchecking, and print spooling; Textpack 4 added automatic hyphenation, columns, and more sophisticated merging; and Textpack 6 added automatic footnoting and outlining. Other options included multilingual dictionaries, graphics, and reports.

Reception and Sales 
Unlike some of IBM's other distributed solutions of this era, such as the System/23, 5520 and 5280, which floundered and had limited sales, the Displaywriter was initially a modest success. Tom Willmott, director of User Programs at International Data Corporation in the early 1980's, estimated that roughly 200,000 units had shipped within the first two years of the Displaywriter going on sale to the public. Initial reception of the Displaywriter was also favorable. The Textpack software, especially Textpack 4 and 6 with multitasking and macro support, had word processing features that were considered advanced at the time, and the user interface was reported as being simple to navigate. The 8" disks at the time were cheaper, less prone to data corruption, and could hold more data than the contemporaneous 320k " floppies. However, the IBM Personal Computer line, which went on the market in 1981, had even better sales numbers in the same timeframe and as the PC and clone market exploded, Displaywriter sales quickly fell off to near zero in the United States by the end of 1983. According to Computerworld Magazine, one anonymous technician had installed more than 200 Displaywriter workstations between 1982 and 1983, but only a total of 11 in 1984. For most businesses, an IBM PC or a PC compatible was the obvious choice.

DisplayWrite 
The Displaywriter's initial success, in conjunction with IBM's 1984 push to unify its office automation products, prompted IBM to develop a parallel to the Displaywriter's Textpack software for the PC line, System/36 line and S/370 line. This software, dubbed DisplayWrite (with a capital w), had improved features over the Displaywriter's Textpacks, such as ASCII file integration, ASCII file editing, and increased printer support, but retained similar menus to the Textpack software. There were initially three tiers of DisplayWrite, which IBM stated were comparable to Textpack 4 and 6, but with the Displaywriter's withdrawal from marketing, DisplayWrite's features ultimately superseded Textpack as support for DisplayWrite continued until 2015. 

There were also additional parallels of Displaywriter software released as companion software to DisplayWrite, with the "Extended Spelling Dictionary" getting a parallel release as "DisplayWrite Legal Support" and the Displaywriter Bisynchcronous Communications software getting a parallel release as "DisplayComm Binary Synchronous Communications". The DisplayComm software acted as a document unification platform between IBM PC, System/36, S/370, Displaywriter and 5520 systems and was capable of connecting a compatible system in those product lines to another compatible system in order to exchange documents either way between the two.

The basic Displaywriter was a standalone system. An optional central storage and management unit was available, which permitted multiple Displaywriters to share storage and a printer. Connections to other IBM systems included:
 IBM 3278 emulation program to attach to IBM 3274/3276 controllers, IBM 4321/4331, or IBM 4701.
 IBM 3277 emulation program to attach to IBM 3271, 3272 or 3274 controllers. 
 Connection to IBM 8100 systems which use DPCX/DOSF.
  IBM Displaywriter/PC Attachment program on 8-inch floppies and cable connecting the Magnetic card port of the Displaywriter to the asynchronous communications port of an IBM PC XT allowing the user to transfer data.

References

External links
 

Displaywriter System
Word processors